Otalo.com  (pronounced ō·tal·ō) is a fare aggregator and metasearch engine for vacation rentals. It enables its users to search across different vacation rental advertising sites using a single search.

The site was launched by Baer Tierkel and Mike Giles. Giles was previously the founder of the social bookmarking site Furl, that was acquired by LookSmart in 2004.  Tierkel was previously the co-founder of the social citizenship site Localocracy, as well as chief marketing officer of the enterprise software company PeopleSoft.

History 
Otalo.com was conceived of by Tierkel and Giles in 2009 in Amherst, Massachusetts . They came up with the name of the site, Otalo, by combining the Zen symbol enzo ("O") with the Finnish word for house ("talo") after having found so many website names already taken.

Otalo.com was launched in 2009, providing search of over 200,000 vacation rental listings. In February 2012, Otalo increased its search index to over 1.6 million vacation rental listings in 164 countries.

Product

Vacation Rental Search 
Otalo.com is a travel metasearch engine that enables visitors to search across many vacation rental sites with a single search. The site aggregates listings from multiple vacation rental sites, eliminating duplicate information and organizes the results into a coherent collection.  Visitors can either browse vacation rental listings by location or can search for specific locations, availability dates, how much they want to spend, number of bedrooms, and details about pets, smoking, and waterfront.

Otalo.com has been called "the KAYAK of vacation rentals".

Partners & Listings 
Otalo.com does not take direct property listings - it only aggregates properties from large vacation rental sites.

The firm's search index includes 1.6 million vacation rental listings in 164 countries. The index includes 46 vacation rental websites in its search index.

References

External links 
 

American travel websites
Vacation rental
Metasearch engines
Hospitality companies of the United States
Online companies of the United States
Amherst, Massachusetts
Hospitality companies established in 2009
Real estate companies established in 2009
Internet properties established in 2009